Mediterranean Tales (Across the Waters) is the debut album of German progressive rock group Triumvirat.

Track listing

Personnel

Jürgen Fritz – Hammond B3 organ, electric piano, Grand piano, Moog synthesizer, vocals on Eleven Kids, vocals & chorus on Broken Mirror
Hans-Georg Pape – bass, lead vocals, except on Eleven kids, vocals & chorus on Broken Mirror
Hans Bathelt – drums, percussion, words & lyrics

References 

1972 debut albums
Triumvirat albums
Harvest Records albums